José Antonio "Toño" García Fernández (born 17 January 1992) is a former Mexican professional footballer, who played as a defender for UNAM Pumas in Liga MX.

Career

Youth
García began his career with the Pumas U-20 youth team. So far during the season, he has played seven games and scored one goal. Due to his good playing skills, he has been called up to Pumas first team. He studied in CEAM México school.

UNAM
Debuted in the Primera División (First Division) versus Puebla in the Cuauhtemoc Stadium and his team lost 2–1, also played his first game against Cruz Azul at CU and also lost by the same score.

José Antonio has also played in the CONCACAF Champions League for Pumas, playing in four games.

External links 

 Jose Antonio Garcia's Concachampions games

1992 births
Living people
Footballers from Mexico City
Association football defenders
Mexican footballers
Club Universidad Nacional footballers
Club Atlético Zacatepec players